Christopher John Duffy (born 31 October 1973) is an English former footballer who played as a defender and a midfielder.

Career
Initially playing in the youth set-up at both Manchester City and Crewe Alexandra, Duffy signed professional terms with Crewe in 1992. Whilst at Crewe, Duffy joined Mossley for a nine-game loan spell in the 1991–1992 season.

In 1993, Duffy signed for Wigan Athletic, making 31 Football League appearances at the club, scoring once. In 1994, Duffy signed for Northwich Victoria, playing for the club for five seasons, before signing for Canvey Island in July 1999 for a record transfer fee of £5,000. In 2006, Duffy briefly signed for Salisbury City, before joining former Canvey Island manager Jeff King at Chelmsford City, following King's takeover of the club. In July 2009, Duffy signed for East Thurrock United.

After retiring from football in 2010, Duffy took up a physiotherapist role at Chelmsford City.

References

1973 births
Living people
Association football defenders
Association football midfielders
English footballers
People from Eccles, Greater Manchester
Crewe Alexandra F.C. players
Mossley A.F.C. players
Wigan Athletic F.C. players
Northwich Victoria F.C. players
Canvey Island F.C. players
Salisbury City F.C. players
Chelmsford City F.C. players
East Thurrock United F.C. players
English Football League players
England semi-pro international footballers
Association football physiotherapists
Chelmsford City F.C. non-playing staff